The 2013 McDonald's All-American Girls Game is an All-star basketball game that was played on April 3, 2013 at the United Center in Chicago, Illinois, home of the Chicago Bulls. The game's rosters featured the best and most highly recruited high school girls graduating in 2013.  The game is the 12th annual version of the McDonald's All-American Game first played in 2002.

2013 Game
The West team started strong, opening up an eleven-point lead early at 17–6. The game was roughly even from then until halftime, when the West led by ten points. Neither team shot well, with the East hitting just over 30% of their shots, and the West hitting 36%. However, the better shooting percentage and a rebounding edge by the West team, coupled with 21 turnovers by the East team, resulted in a large margin of victory by the West team, with a final score of 92–64. The West's Mercedes Russell had a double-double with 16 points and 12 rebounds, which helped her win the Award for Most Outstanding Player of the tournament.

2013 East Roster
Source:

2013 West Roster
Source:

Coaches
Source:

The East team was coached by:
 Head Coach—Fred Priester of Oakton High School (Vienna, Virginia)
 Assistant coach—Krista Jay of Oakton High School (Vienna, Virginia)
 Assistant coach—Derek Fisher of Loudoun County High School (Leesburg, Virginia)

The West team was coached by:
 Head Coach - Anthony Smith of Bolingbrook High School (Bolingbrook, Illinois)
 Assistant coach - Willie Smith of Bolingbrook High School (Bolingbrook, Illinois)
 Assistant coach - Evan Bercot of Bolingbrook High School (Bolingbrook, Illinois)

All-American Week

Schedule 

 Monday, April 1: Powerade Jamfest
 Slam Dunk Contest 
 Three-Point Shoot-out
 Timed Basketball Skills Competition
 Wednesday, April 3: 34th Annual Girls All-American Game

Contest Winners
 Jessica Washington won the skills competition
 Rebecca Greenwell won the three point shooting competition

See also
2013 McDonald's All-American Boys Game

References

External links
McDonald's All-American on the web

2013 in American women's basketball
2013